("Peter Evil-schemer" in Spanish) is a character from Latin American (especially Chilean and Guatemalan) folklore that typifies the rogue, rascal or trickster.

Origin
The origin of this character is present in the medieval Spanish legends. The oldest documented reference was found in the late 12th century, in an Aragonese paper, in which a character is named  ("Peter of Bad-things-schemer" in Aragonese).

Pedro de Urdemalas or Pedro Malasartes is also considered a trickster figure in Iberian and Latin American tradition.

First appearance in literature

The first literary mention is located in the book , by Suero de Quiñones, possibly written in 1440. Shortly after, new references are found in theatrical authors about this character, where he becomes a prototype of a ruffian in several entremeses (interludes). Thus, Pedro de Urdemales takes part in works of Juan del Encina, Lucas Fernández, Lope de Rueda and Juan de Timoneda.

Miguel de Cervantes, author of Don Quixote, wrote a full-length comedy in verse based on the character, and entitled . In 1615, it was published in the collection  ("Eight Plays and Eight Interludes"), and can be read online, and has been translated into English several times. It has, however, rarely been produced.

See also 
 Till Eulenspiegel: Similar German legend
 Coyote (mythology)

References

 Pedro de Urdemalas at Proyecto Cervantes

Literary archetypes by name
Mexican folklore
Latin American folklore
Chilean folklore
Spanish folklore
Guatemalan folklore
Fictional tricksters
Fictional characters introduced in the 15th century